Kailasagiri is a hilltop park in the city of Visakhapatnam in the Indian state of Andhra Pradesh. The park was developed by the Visakhapatnam Metropolitan Region Development Authority (VMRDA) and comprises  of land covered with flora and tropical trees.

The Government of Andhra Pradesh awarded Kailasagiri as its "Best Tourist Spot" in 2003. On average, around three hundred thousand Indian and foreign tourists visit the park every year. To protect the environment, VMRDA has declared the hill a plastic-free zone. A cable car connects to the top of the hill, the first of its kind in Andhra Pradesh.
Kailasagiri is located around 10 km from the Visakhapatnam Railway Station and around 8 km from Visakhapatnam Dwaraka Bus Station.

View from hilltop

Gallery

References

Tourist attractions in Visakhapatnam
Geography of Visakhapatnam
Aerial tramways in India
Parks in Visakhapatnam
Uttarandhra